Tudi may refer to:

Tudigong or Tudi, a Chinese tutelary deity 
Tudy of Landevennec, also known as Tudi, Medieval Breton saint
Tudi Wiggins, Canadian actress
Tudi Roche, American actress and singer
Dilyimit Tudi, Chinese footballer

Places
Tudi Township, Chongqing, China
Tudi, Iran, a village in Sangan Rural District, Khash County, Sistan and Baluchestan Province, Iran